Hasarius firmus is a jumping spider species in the genus Hasarius that lives in Cameroon. It was first described in 2013.

References

Endemic fauna of Cameroon
Salticidae
Spiders of Africa
Arthropods of Cameroon
Spiders described in 2013
Taxa named by Wanda Wesołowska